Kyle Miyata Larson (born July 31, 1992) is an American professional auto racing driver. He competes full-time in the NASCAR Cup Series, driving the No. 5 Chevrolet Camaro ZL1 for Hendrick Motorsports and part-time in the NASCAR Xfinity Series, driving the No. 17 Chevrolet Camaro for the same team. Larson is the 2021 NASCAR Cup Series champion, the 2012 NASCAR K&N Pro Series East champion and Rookie of the Year, the 2013 NASCAR Nationwide Series Rookie of the Year and the 2014 Cup Series Rookie of the Year. Before and throughout his stock car racing career, Larson has been highly successful in dirt track racing, with wins in prestigious events including the Kings Royal, Knoxville Nationals and Chili Bowl Nationals. He is also an overall winner of the 24 Hours of Daytona sports car race, having won the event with Chip Ganassi Racing in 2015.

Racing career

Early career

Born on July 31, 1992 in Elk Grove, California, Larson attended his first race with his parents a week after his birth. He began racing at the age of seven in outlaw karts in Northern California. As a teenager, he raced open-wheel cars, including United States Auto Club (USAC) midget, Silver Crown and sprint cars, competing for Keith Kunz Motorsports and Hoffman Racing with Toyota backing; During his early career in USAC, a series official gave Larson the nickname "Yung Money" in recognition of his talent. He also raced in World of Outlaws sprint cars. His first sprint car race win came at Placerville Speedway, where he was one of the youngest drivers to ever compete. He won the 2011 4-Crown Nationals at Eldora Speedway, winning in all three types of USAC cars in a single night, only the second driver in history to accomplish the feat. He won two silver crown races that season and was named the 2011 Rookie of the Year. He holds the sprint car track record at Ocean Speedway in Watsonville, California, set in 2010. In 2012, he won six USAC National Midget races including the Turkey Night Grand Prix. Even during his stock car career, Larson continued racing open-wheel cars for midweek races in addition to going to New Zealand in some off-seasons to race.

Stock cars

Touring series

While Larson expressed some interest in IndyCar racing, he was signed for the 2012 racing season by Earnhardt Ganassi Racing (EGR) as part of the team's driver development program. In February 2012, at the Pete Orr Memorial Orange Blossom 100 at New Smyrna Speedway, Larson made his first start in a full-bodied stock car and won the race, leading only the final lap. A week later, he won again at the speedway during the World Series of Asphalt. Larson ran full-time in the NASCAR K&N Pro Series East, driving for Rev Racing. In the first race of the season at Bristol, Larson finished 9th. At the Bowman Gray Stadium, Larson started on the pole and later finished 5th. He won his first K&N Pro Series East win at Gresham Motorsports Park in Jefferson, Georgia. Larson earned his 2nd career win at New Hampshire. On June 15, 2012, Larson made his ARCA Racing Series debut at Michigan International Speedway in the No. 6 car for Eddie Sharp Racing. He finished 13th in the race. Larson won the 2012 NASCAR K&N Pro Series East Championship with 2 wins and 12 top tens in 14 races, overcoming the five wins of Corey LaJoie (son of two-time Busch Series champion Randy). Larson was also named the NASCAR K&N Pro Series East Rookie of the Year. On June 7, 2014, Larson won his first ARCA win at Pocono Raceway from the pole.

Truck Series

In late June 2012, Larson made his Camping World Truck Series debut at Kentucky Speedway in the No. 4 Chevrolet Silverado for Turner Motorsports. He qualified 25th but had to move to the rear of the field due to an engine change and finished 10th.

On April 14, 2013, Larson won his first Truck Series win at Rockingham Speedway in a close finish with Joey Logano. During the celebration, Larson performed donuts without his steering wheel on, a practice he had acquired when racing go karts. The celebration prompted NASCAR to request him to keep it attached, regarding safety concerns because Larson would not have much control of the truck without the steering wheel. He finished 2nd in the inaugural Mudsummer Classic at Eldora Speedway.

In 2016, Larson joined GMS Racing to drive the No. 24 truck for the Martinsville race. At Martinsville, Larson qualified 5th and finished 4th. At the Eldora Speedway, Larson's tire went down on lap 51 and was penalized for intentionally bringing out the caution. He spent 20 laps a lap down before getting the free pass and went on to score his second career Truck Series win after holding off Christopher Bell.

In 2020, Larson announced he would be re-joining GMS Racing to drive the No. 24 truck for the Homestead race to pursue a bounty offered by Kevin Harvick to full-time Cup drivers to beat Kyle Busch. Following his suspension from NASCAR, Larson was released from the team.

In 2021, Larson joined Niece Motorsports to drive the No. 44 truck for the new Bristol dirt race. Larson started 28th after the heat races were cancelled due to rain and finished 35th.

Xfinity Series

On February 2013, it was announced that Larson will race full-time in the Nationwide Series to drive the No. 32 Chevrolet Camaro for Turner Scott Motorsports. On the last lap in the DRIVE4COPD 300 at Daytona International Speedway, he was involved in a violent crash in which his car went airborne and pierced the catchfence, completely ripping off the front end of his car. He was unharmed, but the debris hurt several spectators in the stands. In the inaugural Nationwide Children's Hospital 200 at the Mid-Ohio Sports Car Course, Larson was sent off the track and into the tire barriers on lap one. However, after falling three laps down due to repairs, he recovered to finish on the lead lap in 14th. After the season finale at Homestead, Larson was named the 2013 Nationwide Series Rookie of the Year and became the first Asian-American and first Drive for Diversity participant to win a Rookie of the Year Award in one of NASCAR's national touring series.

Larson returned to the Nationwide Series in 2014 to run part-time in the No. 42 car for Turner Scott Motorsports. On March 22, Larson won his first ever Nationwide Series win at Auto Club Speedway after holding off Kyle Busch and Kevin Harvick. In victory lane, Larson stated, "Those last 11, 12 laps were the longest laps of my life. I've been so close to winning so many times, but the fashion we did it in was extra special." Larson once again celebrated by doing burnouts in the infield without a steering wheel. Larson earned his second career win at Charlotte Motor Speedway.

In 2015, Larson returned to race part-time again in the Xfinity Series for HScott Motorsports. He won at Homestead-Miami Speedway after holding off Austin Dillon, and the first win for HScott Motorsports.

In 2022, Larson drove the No. 17 Chevrolet for Hendrick Motorsports at Road America where he won the first two stages and led the most laps, but eventually lost to Ty Gibbs on the final lap and finished second. At Watkins Glen, Larson qualified 3rd but had to start at the rear due to unnapproved adjustments and went on to score his 13th career win after William Byron and Ty Gibbs spun together while battling for the lead during the final restart. At the September Darlington race, Larson finished fifth after a three-car battle with winner Noah Gragson and Sheldon Creed on the closing laps.

Cup Series

Phoenix Racing

2013
On August 27, 2013, The Charlotte Observer reported that Larson will drive the No. 42 car for Chip Ganassi Racing in the Sprint Cup Series starting in the 2014 season and would compete for the Rookie of the Year honors. The deal was officially announced on August 30. On October 1, it was announced that Larson would make his Sprint Cup Series debut at Charlotte Motor Speedway in the No. 51 car for Phoenix Racing to prepare for his rookie season. At Charlotte, Larson started 21st and finished 37th after an engine failure on lap 247. Larson made his second Cup start at Martinsville Speedway where he started 26th and finished 42nd after another engine failure.

Chip Ganassi Racing

2014

In his Daytona 500 debut, Larson started 16th and got into the wall twice and despite fixing the damage, he spun out on lap 22. Larson finished 38th after he got wrecked by Austin Dillon that triggered a 7-car wreck on lap 163. At Auto Club Speedway, Larson started 11th and later finished second to Kyle Busch. After qualifying was rained out, Larson started first based on being the fastest in practice. During the race, he was spun out by Clint Bowyer on lap 1, but recovered later and finished 16th. Larson finished ninth at Talladega after starting 29th. He had a very impressive run at Pocono Raceway where he ran in the top ten the entire race and finished fifth. 

At Michigan, Larson spun out on lap 7. Despite that, he spent 33 laps recovering from 43rd to finish eighth. During the Michigan race, Larson made a block on one of his strong supporters Tony Stewart while trying to go for the lead. The block damaged Stewart's grille. In response, Stewart tried to retaliate under a yellow-flag period. When told that Stewart was mad at him for the block, Larson shrugged it off replying "Tony being Tony, i guess. I was pretty tight on whoever was inside of me on the restart and i was looking in my mirror and saw him juke to the right so i juked to the right and he hit me and i don't know, he was just trying to teach me a lesson, i'm guessing." 

Before the Sonoma race, Stewart warned Larson, angrily saying "He'll learn not to block me anytime soon." During the Coke Zero 400, Larson was involved in a big wreck on lap 21 where he finished 36th. He rebounded the next race at Loudon with a third-place finish. Larson finished seventh at Indianapolis. He finished 11th in the race.

Larson missed his chance to make the Chase after a 11th-place finish at Richmond. At Chicagoland, Larson led 20 laps and finished third. At New Hampshire, Larson finished second to Joey Logano. At Kansas, he finished second again to Logano and his third runner-up finish. Following the 2014 season, Larson earned the Sprint Cup Series Rookie of the Year award with his statistics being higher than other rookie seasons in history, such as those of Richard Petty and Jeff Gordon.

2015

Larson began the 2015 season with a DNF in the Daytona 500 where he finished 34th. Larson finished eighth at Las Vegas and his first Top 10 of the season. He finished 10th at Phoenix. During an autograph session at Martinsville Speedway, Larson fainted and was hospitalized. He was replaced by Regan Smith. Two days later, He was released from the hospital with a diagnosis of dehydration as being the cause of the faint.

Larson started on the pole in the Quaker State 400 at Kentucky Speedway after qualifying was canceled due to rain and finished 35th. After a 12th-place finish at Richmond, Larson failed to make the Chase. During the Charlotte race, Larson and Kyle Busch both collided at the entrance of pit road which ended Larson's chances of winning and finished 21st.

2016

Larson started the 2016 season with a seventh-place finish at Daytona, his first top 10 and first non-DNF. Larson ran very great at Martinsville where he finished third. He had a top 5 car at Kansas before he was involved in a crash with Denny Hamlin, Joey Logano, and Brad Keselowski on lap 242 and finished 35th. 

At Dover, Larson came up short to Matt Kenseth. Afterwards, Larson stated, "Matt Kenseth, in my eyes, is the cleanest racer out there. I didn't want to drive him dirty because he always races me clean. Looking back, I'd do stuff different but my time is coming." 

During the Sprint Showdown, Larson battled with Chase Elliott for the win in the final segment. While the two made contact as they approached the start/finish line, Larson beat Elliott to lock himself into the All-Star Race. At the All-Star Race, Larson took the lead on the final restart, but was caught by Joey Logano and hit the wall with two laps to go and finished 16th. 

At the 2016 Pure Michigan 400, Larson scored his first ever Sprint Cup Series win after holding off Chase Elliott. The win also qualified him into the Chase for the first time. In his first Chase appearance, Larson finished 18th at Chicagoland and earned a 10th-place finish at New Hampshire. He was eliminated following the Round of 16 after a 25th-place finish at Dover.

2017

Larson took the lead on the final lap in the Daytona 500 but ran out of fuel and finished 12th. At Atlanta, Larson finished 2nd to Brad Keselowski. He would finish second in the next two races at Las Vegas and Phoenix which he moved up to 1st in the points standings for the first time in his career. 

At the Auto Club 400, Larson scored his second career Cup Series win from the pole and increasing his points lead by 29 points over Chase Elliott. A 17th-place finish at Martinsville Speedway hurt him, but he still maintained a four-point lead in the standings. In the 2017 O'Reilly Auto Parts 500 at Texas, Larson rebounded from struggles early to finish second.

At Michigan, Larson led 96 laps and earned his third career win after holding off Chase Elliott. At the Kentucky race, Larson started at the rear of the field after he was unable to set a qualifying time as he was stuck in an inspection. He finished second to Martin Truex Jr., but lost his points lead when he was penalized 35 points for an improper rear brake cooling assembly. Crew chief Chad Johnston was suspended for three races and Tony Lunders took his place. 

A week later, Larson won the pole for the Loudon's Overton's 301, but was forced to surrender it to Truex after failing post-qualifying inspection for an unapproved rear deck fin lid. He finished second in the race after starting 39th. Larson earned his fourth career win at Michigan and his 3rd consecutive Michigan win after he made a four-wide pass for the lead with two laps to go. Larson earned his fifth career win at Richmond (and his first win that is not a two-mile track) in the final race of the regular season.

In the Round of 16, Larson scored Top 5 finishes at Chicagoland, New Hampshire and Dover. Unfortunately, Larson's championship hopes went away at Kansas when his engine was blown on lap 72, resulted in a dismal 39th-place finish. Larson would struggle after being eliminated where he finished 37th at Martinsville and Texas, both due to crashes, and a last-place finish at Phoenix after an engine failure. On November 29, Larson was named the Mobil 1 Driver of the Year.

2018

Despite being winless throughout the 2018 season, Larson made it to the Playoffs by staying consistent with five second-place finishes, eight Top 5's, and 13 Top 10's. In the Round of 16, Larson finished second to Brad Keselowski at Las Vegas, his sixth runner-up finish of the season, and a 7th-place finish at Richmond.

During the Charlotte Roval race, Larson was involved in a multi-car wreck on a late restart that also included playoff contenders Brad Keselowski and Kyle Busch. Larson's car was heavily damaged as a result of the wreck but was able to limp across the finish line in 25th and barely made it to the Round of 12. 

He experienced further bad luck at Talladega when a right front tire blew and spun out on lap 105. He finished 11th in the race but was docked 10 driver and 10 owner points after the team violated the damaged vehicle policy by using metal tabs instead of fasteners and/or tape to repair the torn right front fender. Larson was eliminated from the following the Round of 12 after the Kansas fall race. Larson finished the season ninth in the points standings, the highest of the winless drivers in 2018 along with a third consecutive top 10 points finish.

2019

Before the start of the 2019 season, Larson lost his primary sponsor DC Solar, whose headquarters had been raided by the FBI. Larson started out the season with a 7th-place finish at Daytona, his first top 10 of the season. On February 19, McDonald's announced it would serve as a primary sponsor for Kyle Larson throughout the 2019 season. At Atlanta, Larson led over 100 laps before he was penalized for speeding on pit road which sent him to the back of the field and finished 12th. 

On February 26, Larson sparked controversy on the NBC Sports segment Splash & Go! with host Rick Allen when he jokingly implied that Hendrick Motorsports starts "cheating and finding some speed" a couple of months into the start of a season. He later apologized to Rick Hendrick for his comments. On the final lap in the GEICO 500 at Talladega, Larson was involved in a major accident, resulting his car going airborne and rolling over multiple times. He was uninjured and was credited with a 24th-place finish.

On May 18, Larson won the Monster Energy Open to transfer into the All-Star Race. Later that night, he scored his first All-Star win and became the third Cup driver to win both the Monster Energy Open and the All-Star race. Larson won the pole at Sonoma for the third straight year and finished 10th in the race. A week later at Chicagoland, Larson finished second after getting passed by Alex Bowman for the lead with six laps to go. After a second-place finish at Darlington, Larson clinched his spot in the playoffs for the fourth straight year despite no wins. He finished 13th at the Charlotte Roval.

At Dover, Larson started second and went on to score his sixth career win, ended his 75-race winless streak. The win locked him into the Round of 8. Larson finished 39th at Talladega after getting involved in a big crash on lap 108 that left him with a fractured lower rib. He finished 14th at Kansas. Despite finishing 4th at Phoenix, Larson was eliminated following the Round of 8. At Homestead, Larson finished 40th after an engine failure on lap 209. He finished the season sixth in the points standings, his career-best to date.

2020 and suspension
Larson began the 2020 season with a tenth-place finish in the Daytona 500. During the Auto Club 400, Larson hit the turn one wall after Denny Hamlin collided with him, relegating him to a 21st-place finish. When the season was placed on hold after four races due to the COVID-19 pandemic, Larson was seventh in the point standings.

On April 13, 2020, Larson was indefinitely suspended by Chip Ganassi Racing without pay after he used a racial slur during an iRacing event the day before. Shortly after Ganassi's announcement, NASCAR also suspended Larson indefinitely and ordered him to complete sensitivity training before he is allowed to race again. Larson would also be suspended by the World of Outlaws, but his suspension had lifted prior to their return to racing. Multiple corporations such as McDonald's, Credit One Bank, and Chevrolet also terminated their sponsorship of Larson. The following day, CGR fired Larson. Matt Kenseth replaced Larson in the No. 42 for the rest of the 2020 season. 

In October 2020, after months of inactivity on social media, Larson posted an essay on his website, apologizing for using the slur and denying that it was representative of who he was. In the statement, Larson said that when racing overseas, he encountered people who used the word regularly. He accepted accountability for his actions, including his suspension and dismissal from CGR, and said that although he finished the sensitivity training, he did more than what was required of him to change his behavior; for instance, he went to Minnesota after George Floyd was murdered and participated in a variety of classes to learn more on the African-American community. 

The statement also said that some of the people in his career, including Ganassi, kept in touch with him during his rehabilitation in which convinced him to have hope in saving his career. Larson also said that he hopes his setback "was a lesson for everyone," and was in the process of seeking reinstatement to the Cup Series. In mid-October, it was reported that Larson officially applied for reinstatement. On the same month, it was announced that NASCAR had reinstated Larson's competition privileges effective on January 1, 2021.

Hendrick Motorsports

2021: First championship

On October 28, 2020, it was announced that Hendrick Motorsports signed Larson to a multi-year deal to drive the No. 5 car for the 2021 NASCAR Cup Series season. At the time of the announcement, it was also announced that the No. 5 car was not sponsored yet, though Hendrick announced that he would self-sponsor the car through his HendrickCars.com and NationsGuard companies until they found long-term sponsors. It was also announced later on that, although Hendrick normally did not allow their drivers to race anywhere other than their NASCAR team, the team negotiated a clause in the contract allowing Larson to continue racing dirt races, provided that he focused primarily on the Cup program. In his fourth start with HMS, Larson won at Las Vegas after leading 103 laps. He had finished second nine times on 1.5-mile tracks prior to his victory.

At the Coca-Cola 600, Larson dominated the race where he led 327 of 400 laps on his way to his second win of the season. Larson's victory was also the 269th career Cup victory for Hendrick Motorsports, surpassing Petty Enterprises for the most Cup victories as a race team in NASCAR history. The following race in the Toyota/Save Mart 350 at Sonoma Raceway, Larson earned his 3rd win of the season after leading 57 laps. A week later at Texas, Larson earned his second All-Star win from the pole and became the 9th driver to win the All-Star Race more than once. He also became the 8th driver in NASCAR Cup Series history to win the Coca-Cola 600 and the All-Star race in the same season. Larson earned his 10th career win at Nashville after leading 264 of 300 laps and his third consecutive win (All-Star races, as they are not points-paying, are not included). 

In the Pocono doubleheader, Larson was leading on the final lap and almost won his 4th straight race until the left front tire blew out and hit the turn 3 wall and his teammate Alex Bowman end up winning the race. Larson would end up 9th. The next day, despite resorting to a backup car as a result of the incident, Larson rebounded to finish 2nd to Kyle Busch after a fuel gamble.

During the Road America, Larson was accidentally spun out by Bowman while running in the Top 5 and would end up 16th. The next week at Atlanta, Larson was running 4th before he was penalized for speeding on the final round of pit stops and would end up in 18th. He would finish 7th at New Hampshire, the highest placing Chevrolet in the field.

At Watkins Glen, Larson scored his 5th win of the season, a career high, after holding off his teammate Chase Elliott. After the Watkins Glen race, Larson and Denny Hamlin were tied for the points lead in the regular season standings. Following the 2021 Coke Zero Sugar 400, Larson clinched the Regular Season Championship by 28 points over Hamlin.

In the Round of 16, Larson finished 2nd to Hamlin after leading the most laps at Darlington. Following a 6th-place finish at Richmond, Larson was automatically locked into the Round of 12 based on points. At Bristol, Larson led 175 laps and went on to score his 6th win of the season at Bristol. His win would somewhat be overshadowed by an altercation between Kevin Harvick and Chase Elliott after the race due to an on-track incident.

During the Round of 12, Larson finished 10th at Las Vegas and 37th at Talladega. At the Charlotte Roval race, Larson's car was suffering alternator belt issues and he came down pit road where the pit crew had to fix the alternator belt. Despite the issues, he was able to recover and would go on to win his 7th race of the season. Larson became the first driver in NASCAR Cup Series history to win three different road courses in the same season and also became the first driver since Kasey Kahne in 2006 to sweep both Charlotte races.

In the Round of 8, Larson won in a dominating fashion in the 2021 Autotrader EchoPark Automotive 500 at Texas Motor Speedway for his 8th win of the season to secure a spot in the Championship 4 for the first time. The following week, Larson earned his 9th win of the season in the Hollywood Casino 400 at Kansas Speedway. He also became the first driver since Dale Earnhardt in 1987 to win three straight races twice in the same season.

In the 2021 NASCAR Cup Series Championship Race at Phoenix Raceway, Larson started on the pole and scored his tenth win of the season and became the 2021 NASCAR Cup Series Champion. He became the first driver to have 10 wins and a championship in the same season since Jimmie Johnson did it in 2007 season. Larson ended his 2021 season with 10 wins, 18 stage wins, 20 top fives, 26 top tens, 2,581 laps led, and an average finish of 9.1.

2022

Larson earned his first Daytona 500 pole. During the 2022 Daytona 500, Larson was involved in a late race crash on lap 192 and finished 32nd. Larson earned his 17th career win at Auto Club Speedway. At Sonoma, Larson's No. 5 car lost a tire on lap 84. Following the Sonoma race, crew chief Cliff Daniels was suspended from the next four races. Kevin Meendering, who served as a crew chief for Jimmie Johnson during the 2019 season, filled in for Cliff.

Daniels returned at Pocono after his suspension. Larson would finish seventh at Pocono but was later credited with a P5 when eventual winner Denny Hamlin and runner-up finish Kyle Busch were disqualified after their cars failed post-race inspection. Larson started second and went on to score his 18th career win at Watkins Glen and his second consecutive Watkins Glen win. During the 2022 Coke Zero Sugar 400 at Daytona, Larson's car suffered engine issues on lap 15, resulted in a 37th-place finish. 

In the round of 16, Larson's car suffered another engine issues at Darlington and later spun out on lap 193. Despite the issues, he would finish 12th. On September 16, 2022, HMS announced that Larson had signed a multi-year contract extension to remain with the team through 2026. At the Charlotte Roval, Larson was running in the Top 15 when his car's right rear toe link got knocked out after he got into the wall in turn 7 and finished 35th. He was eliminated following the Round of 12. 

At Las Vegas, Larson and Bubba wrecked down the frontstretch on Lap 94 after the two made contact off of turn 4 and Christopher Bell was also involved in the crash. During the caution, Wallace confronted Larson in a shoving match. Larson would end up in 35th. A week later, he won at Homestead after leading 199 of 267 laps. Larson finished his 2022 season seventh in the points standings.

2023
Larson began the 2023 season with an 18th-place finish at the 2023 Daytona 500. On March 15, 2023, the No. 5 was served an L2 penalty after an unapproved hood louver was found installed on the car during pre-race inspection at Phoenix. As a result, the team was docked 100 driver and owner points and 10 playoff points. In addition, crew chief Daniels was suspended for four races and fined 100,000.

Dirt track racing
Larson owned a World of Outlaws sprint car team named Kyle Larson Racing, that fielded a car for Carson Macedo. He acquired full ownership of the team, formerly named Larson Marks Racing after the 2017 season. The team closed following the 2020 season due to COVID-19 pandemic and other issues. He drives for his own team (midgets) and Paul Silva (winged sprint car) on a limited schedule.

On January 18, 2020, Larson won his first ever Chili Bowl. After his suspension and subsequent reinstatement to the World of Outlaws Sprint Car Series, Larson raced in the series beginning in the spring. His first race was on May 8 at Knoxville Raceway, where he started 18th and finished 10th. Two weeks later at Federated Auto Parts Raceway, Larson set a qualifying lap time of 9.995 seconds, the first sub-ten-second time in track history. After finishing second to brother-in-law Brad Sweet in the Friday feature, he held off Brent Marks and Sweet in the Saturday event to score his first World of Outlaws victory since his NASCAR suspension. 

Larson joined the USAC series for the 2020 Indiana Midget Week in June. He went on to win in all six races in the Hoosier state and won the title. Larson continued to win in nine straight sprint car features. Larson competed for the full Pennsylvania Speedweek for 410 Sprint cars. He won the event at Grandview Speedway on Tuesday night after passing Freddie Rahmer with 2 laps remaining. Larson picked up his second win of the week on thursday after leading the entire race at Hagerstown. On Friday, Larson won the Mitch Smith Memorial at Williams Grove Speedway. It was his first win ever at Williams Grove, and his 17th win of the 2020 season. The following night, he won again at the final event at Port Royal. Larson won the PA Speedweek title with four wins and three podiums.

Larson competed in the All Star Circuit of Champions sprint cars and set a series record at Knoxville Raceway when he won his seventh consecutive race. On October 18, he won the USAC Silver Crown Series finale at the Springfield Mile to take his 42nd feature win of the season. Following the 2020 season, Larson was named the 410 Sprint Car Driver of the Year.

On August 2020, following a test at Cherokee Speedway, Larson announced he would be making his debut in a dirt late model at Port Royal Speedway in the Lucas Oil Late Model Dirt Series for owner Kevin Rumley. After a fifth-place finish in the first night of the event, Larson led flag-to-flag in the second night's race to win in his second-ever dirt late model start. Later in the year, he competed in the Dirt Track World Championship at Portsmouth Raceway Park where he finished 30th. Larson will make his World of Outlaws Late Model Series debut at Charlotte. He raced the final two races of the season at The Dirt Track at Charlotte Motor Speedway where he set a new track record in qualifying and posted a best finish of eighth.

Following his reinstatement by NASCAR and signing with Hendrick Motorsports in October 2020, Larson noted in an interview with The Dale Jr. Download that he would be permitted to continue dirt racing in addition to the Cup Series provided the latter be his primary commitment.

On January 16, 2021, Larson won his second consecutive Chili Bowl Nationals over Justin Grant and Tanner Thorson. He raced in the Lucas Oil Late Model Dirt Series' Winternationals for dirt late models where he won the season-opening at All-Tech Raceway. Larson won the third annual BC39 race against 74 USAC National Midgets at the dirt track at Indianapolis Motor Speedway. On August 14, 2021, Larson won the Knoxville Nationals for the first time in his career.

Other racing
On January 4, 2014, Chip Ganassi Racing announced that Larson would enter the 24 Hours of Daytona in the No. 02 car alongside with Scott Dixon, Tony Kanaan and Marino Franchitti. During the press conference, Larson stated, "You grow up watching the NASCAR guys then you're like, ‘wow’ when you meet them. And then watching the guys in different series there's a 'wow' factor to meeting them and working with them." In his Rolex 24 debut, Larson's car stalled and received a speeding penalty, but finished his stint with a fifth-place finish.

Larson returned in the No. 02 Ford Daytona Prototype for the 2015 event along with Chip Ganassi Racing teammates from IndyCar Scott Dixon and Tony Kanaan and NASCAR Jamie McMurray. The team ultimately won the race.

In 2016, Larson once again returned for the 24 Hours of Daytona in the Ford EcoBoost Daytona Prototype for Chip Ganassi Racing. The team consisted of the same drivers from the 2015 winning car but ran into issues with brake failures plaguing the team throughout the race.

On January 12, 2023, it was announced that Larson will attempt to run the 2024 Indianapolis 500 for Arrow McLaren. He would become the fifth driver to attempt the Double.

In popular media
Larson made a cameo appearance as a limo driver in the 2017 film Logan Lucky.

Personal life

Larson's mother is Japanese American and her parents spent time in a Japanese internment camp. Larson's wife is Katelyn Sweet, the sister of World Of Outlaw sprint driver and NASCAR driver Brad Sweet. Larson announced on June 13, 2014 that he and his girlfriend were expecting a child. On July 16, Larson announced that the baby was a boy.  Owen Miyata Larson was born on December 22, 2014.  On November 8, 2017, Larson announced on social media that he and Katelyn were expecting a second child, due in May 2018. Audrey Layne Larson was born in 2018. On December 22, 2017, Larson and Sweet became engaged  and they were married on September 26, 2018. On December 31st, 2022, Larson and Katelyn’s third child Cooper Donald Larson was born.

Motorsports career results

Career summary

 Season still in progress.
 Ineligible for series points.

NASCAR
(key) (Bold – Pole position awarded by qualifying time. Italics – Pole position earned by points standings or practice time. * – Most laps led. ** – All laps led.)

Cup Series

Daytona 500

Xfinity Series

 Season still in progress 
 Ineligible for series points

Camping World Truck Series

 Season still in progress 
 Ineligible for series points

ARCA Menards Series East

ARCA Menards Series West

ARCA Menards Series
(key) (Bold – Pole position awarded by qualifying time. Italics – Pole position earned by points standings or practice time. * – Most laps led.)

Complete WeatherTech SportsCar Championship results
(key) (Races in bold indicate pole position) (Races in italics indicate fastest lap)

24 Hours of Daytona

References

External links

 
 

Living people
1992 births
Sportspeople from Elk Grove, California
Racing drivers from California
NASCAR drivers
NASCAR Cup Series champions
American sportspeople of Japanese descent
24 Hours of Daytona drivers
WeatherTech SportsCar Championship drivers
World of Outlaws drivers
NASCAR controversies
Video game controversies
Chip Ganassi Racing drivers
Hendrick Motorsports drivers
USAC Silver Crown Series drivers
NASCAR Cup Series regular season champions
JR Motorsports drivers